A dark-sky preserve (DSP) is an area, usually surrounding a park or observatory, that restricts artificial light pollution. The purpose of the dark-sky movement is generally to promote astronomy. However, astronomy is not the only objective of conserving a dark sky. A dark night sky is associated with many facets of history, philosophy, religion, societal development, poetry, song, mathematics, and science. Different terms have been used to describe the areas as national organizations have worked independently to create their programs. The International Dark-Sky Association (IDA) uses International Dark Sky Reserve (IDSR) and International Dark Sky Park (IDSP). A third designation, International Dark Sky Sanctuary, was introduced in 2015.

History

An International Dark-Sky Association (IDA) was founded in 1988 to reserve public or private land for an exquisite outlook of nocturnal territories and starry night skies. These reserves are specifically conserved for its scientific, natural, educational, cultural, heritage and public enjoyment.

In 1993, Michigan became the first state in the United States to designate a tract of land as a "Dark Sky Preserve" at the Lake Hudson State Recreation Area. In 1999, the first permanent preserve was established at Torrance Barrens in the Muskoka region of southern Ontario.

The IDA recognizes and accredits dark-sky areas worldwide, in three categories. The Mont Mégantic Observatory in Quebec is the first such site to be recognized (in 2007) as an International Dark Sky Reserve. IDA recognized Natural Bridges National Monument in Utah as the world's first International Dark Sky Park. In 2015, the IDA introduced the term "Dark Sky Sanctuary" and designated the Elqui Valley of northern Chile as the world's first International Dark Sky Sanctuary. The Gabriela Mistral Dark Sky Sanctuary is named after a Chilean poet.

It is generally understood that a dark-sky preserve, or dark-sky reserve, should be sufficiently dark to promote astronomy. However, this is not always the case. The lighting protocol for a dark-sky preserve is based on the sensitivity of wildlife to artificial light at night (ALAN).

Canada has established an extensive and more stringent standard for dark-sky preserves, that addresses lighting within the DSP and influences from skyglow from urban areas in the region. This was based on the work of the Royal Astronomical Society of Canada.

Dark Sky Places
The IDA's Dark Sky Places program offers five types of designations:
 International Dark Sky Communities – Communities are legally organised cities and towns that adopt quality outdoor lighting ordinances and undertake efforts to educate residents about the importance of dark skies.
 International Dark Sky Parks – Parks are publicly or privately owned spaces protected for natural conservation that implement good outdoor lighting and provide dark sky programs for visitors.
 International Dark Sky Reserves – Reserves consist of a dark "core" zone surrounded by a populated periphery where policy controls are enacted to protect the darkness of the core.
 International Dark Sky Sanctuaries – Sanctuaries are the most remote (and often darkest) places in the world whose conservation state is most fragile.
 Dark Sky Developments of Distinction – Developments of Distinction recognize subdivisions, master planned communities, and unincorporated neighborhoods and townships whose planning actively promotes a more natural night sky but does not qualify them for the International Dark Sky Community designation.

Further designations include "Dark Sky Nation", given to the Kaibab Indian Reservation, and "Parashant International Night Sky Province-Window to the Cosmos", given to Grand Canyon-Parashant National Monument.

Dark sky preserves, reserves and parks

Protected zones

Around observatories

Other
Some regions, like the following, are protected without any reference to an observatory or a park.
 Regions of Coquimbo, Atacama, and Antofagasta in northern Chile
 The island of La Palma of the Canary Islands
 The Big Island of Hawaii
 Florida beach communities restrict lighting on beaches, to preserve hatchling Sea Turtles.

By country

Canada
In the Canadian program, lighting within the area must be strictly controlled to minimize the impact of artificial lighting on wildlife. These guidelines are more stringent than in other countries that lack the extensive wilderness areas that still exist in Canada. The management of a Canadian DSP extends their outreach programs from the public that visit the site to include the promotion of better lighting policies in surrounding urban areas. Currently, dark-sky preserves have more control over internal and external lighting than other programs.

With the increase in regional light pollution, some observatories have actively worked with cities in their region to establish protection zones where there is controlled light pollution. These areas may not yet have been declared dark-sky preserves.

Although dark-sky preserve designations are generally sought by astronomers, it is clear that preserving natural darkness has positive effects on the health of nocturnal wildlife within the parks. For example, the nocturnal black-footed ferret was reintroduced to the Grasslands National Park dark-sky preserve and the success of the reintroduction is enhanced by the pristine natural darkness maintained within the park by the DSP agreement.

See also
 Noctcaelador
 Scotobiology
 United States National Radio Quiet Zone

References

External links

 Izera Dark-Sky Park
 Poloniny Dark-Sky Park
 Torrance Barrens Dark-Sky Preserve. Essay by Michael Silver. Royal Astronomical Society of Canada.
 Veľká Fatra Dark-Sky Park
North Frontenac Dark Sky Preserve

 
Astronomy
Protected areas
Darkness
Environmental protection
1993 introductions